Thundenek, marketed theatrically as Her. Him. The Other, is an upcoming Sri Lankan Sinhala tri-segmented anthology film. The film is directed by three award-winning Sri Lankan filmmakers: Asoka Handagama, Vimukthi Jayasundara and Prasanna Vithanage. Produced by The Office for National Unity and Reconciliation (a Department of the Government of Sri Lanka), the film is scored by K. Krishna Kumar and Kapila Poogalaarachchi. The film premiered on 19 February at the Tharanganee Film Hall to mostly positive reviews from critics.

The film revolves around three separate stories linked to postwar experiences and ethnic conflict in Sri Lankan society. The film is also titled Her. Him. The Other due to this narrative structure.

Plot
Her: Directed by Prasanna Vithanage, the segment is about a pro-LTTE videographer, Kesa, who travels around Jaffna in search of a lady called referred to as "Her". 
Him: Directed by Vimukthi Jayasundara, the segment revolves around a Sinhala teacher who begins to believe in the rebirth of a Tamil militant into a Sinhala family. 
The Other: Directed by Asoka Handagama, the final segment is about Tamil mother who comes Colombo in search of her son.

Cast

 Asoka Handagama
 Keshvarajan Nawarathnam
 Nipuni Sharadha
 Pradeep Ramawikrama
 Darshana Vidhya Aravinda

References

External links
 
 Thundenek on YouTube

Sinhala-language films
Films directed by Vimukthi Jayasundara
Films directed by Prasanna Vithanage
Films with screenplays by Prasanna Vithanage